Seo Woo-jin (Korean: 서우진; born 23 July 2015) is a South Korean child actor and model, who appeared in dramas such as The Light in Your Eyes, VIP and Love with Flaws. He is best known for his roles as Cho Seo-woo - daughter of Kim Tae-hee's character in Hi Bye, Mama! (2020) and Lee Se-jong - youngest son of the protagonist played by Ji Hyun-woo in Young Lady and Gentleman (2021).

Career
Seo Woo-jin debuted in 2017 in KBS2's Confession Couple. He appeared in OCN Save Me 2 (2019) and tvN's Hi Bye, Mama! (2020), the latter role where he played a girl, Cho Seo-woo, who is the daughter of the protagonist, Cha Yu-ri, who is portrayed by Kim Tae-hee. Seo was cast due to his striking resemblance to Kim as well as his stable acting abilities, although his costumes, dresses and long hair had some netizens concerned about gender identity.

In 2021, he made his face known by appearing in weekend drama Young Lady and Gentleman as 6 year old cute kindergartener. For his portrayal as the role of the youngest son of the main lead Ji Hyun-woo, he won Best Young Actor award at 2021 KBS Drama Awards.

By 2022 he has appeared in 19 works over the past 6 years. He is appearing in iHQ's romance thriller TV series Sponsor, which began airing from February 23.

Filmography

Film

Television series

Television shows

Awards and nominations

Notes

References

External links 
 
 
 

2015 births
Living people
21st-century South Korean male actors
Male actors from Seoul
South Korean male television actors
South Korean male child actors
South Korean male models